is a Japanese actor and film director. He appeared in more than 30 films since 1990.

Selected filmography

Film

Television

References

External links
 

1959 births
Living people
People from Saitama (city)
Japanese male film actors
Japanese male television actors